Tarık Altuntaş (born 23 August 1991) is a Turkish footballer who plays as a midfielder.

He made his Süper Lig debut on 7 April 2012.

References

External links
 
 Tarık Altuntaş at goal.com
 
 

1991 births
Living people
People from Bor, Niğde
Turkish footballers
Mersin İdman Yurdu footballers
Süper Lig players
Association football midfielders